India women's national basketball team is a national women's national basketball team representing India at the international level.

At the 2017 FIBA Women's Asia Cup, India was promoted to Division A after beating Kazakhstan 75-73 in the Final.

Tournament record

Asia Cup

Asian Games

Commonwealth Games

South Asian Games

Lusofonia Games

Team

2021 roster
Roster for the 2021 FIBA Women's Asia Cup.

Past rosters
2007 FIBA Asia Championship for Women
The following is the Indian women squad that participated in the 2007 FIBA Asia Championship for Women in Korea.

Coaching staff
  Sat Prakash Yadav – Head Coach women team
  Dimal C Mathew – Asst Coach

2009 FIBA Asia Championship for Women

Coaching Staff
  Jay Prakash Singh – Head Coach women team 2009

2009 Asian Indoor Games
The Indian women's squad for 2009 Asian Indoor Games.

Coaching staff
  Keshav Kumar Chansoria – Head Coach women team

2011 FIBA Asia Championship for Women

Coaching Staff
  Pete Guadet – Head Coach women team 2011
 Abdul Hamid Khan – Asstt. Coach
 Trainer – Zack

See also
India men's national basketball team
India women's national under-19 basketball team
India women's national under-17 basketball team
India women's national 3x3 team

References

External links

FIBA profile

 
 
Women's national basketball teams
national